St. Catherine's is a Roman Catholic church on Meath Street, Dublin that is in use today. It was dedicated in 1858 and is the second church to occupy the same site. There is also a small grotto dedicated to Our Lady of Lourdes located on the grounds.

History
There have been two churches on this site, the first being an octagonal chapel opened in 1782. The chapel and a presbytery were knocked down to make way for a bigger church. The foundation stone of the new church was laid on 30 June 1852. The architect was James Joseph McCarthy and construction of the main church was completed in March 1858, but the original design of the upper portion of the tower and spire were never completed. The church was dedicated to Catherine of Alexandria on 30 June 1858.

James Joyce's first short story, The Sisters, concerns a former priest of St. Catherine's Church, Meath Street.

A small grotto was built on the grounds and dedicated to Our Lady of Lourdes. It was renovated and rededicated in 2000.

The church suffered damage from an arson attack in January 2012.

Gallery

See also
 St Catherine's L.F.C.

References

External links

 Saint Catherine’s: the poor man’s Cheadle?

Churches of the Roman Catholic Archdiocese of Dublin
Roman Catholic churches in Dublin (city)